The Inuvik Native Band is a Gwich'in First Nations band government in the Northwest Territories. The band is located in Inuvik, a mixed community where First Nations, Inuit, and non-Indigenous people live in approximately equal numbers.

The Inuvik Native Band is a member of the Gwich'in Tribal Council.

References

First Nations in the Northwest Territories
Gwich'in